Cody Cassidy (born June 26, 1981) is a Canadian professional rodeo cowboy who specializes in steer wrestling. He is a five time Canadian Professional Rodeo Association (CPRA) champion steer wrestler.

Early life
Cassidy was born on June 26, 1981, in Bashaw, Alberta, Canada.

Career
In 2010, he qualified for the National Finals Rodeo, and also won the Houston Livestock Show and Rodeo. That year Cody finished fifth in the Professional Rodeo Cowboys Association (PRCA) world standings, his highest ranking so far, with $155,567.

Personal life
His brother is fellow steer wrestler, Curtis Cassidy.

References

1981 births
Living people
Steer wrestlers
Canadian sportsmen
Sportspeople from Alberta